The Minister of Foreign Affairs of the Central African Republic (known as the Central African Empire in 1976–79) is a government minister in charge of the Ministry of Foreign Affairs of the Central African Republic, responsible for conducting foreign relations of the country.

The following is a list of foreign ministers of the Central African Republic since its founding in 1960:

References

Foreign
Foreign Ministers
Politicians